Andreas Schäffer (born 29 May 1984 in Kelheim) is a former professional German footballer who plays for TV 1906 Riedenburg.

Schäffer made 15 appearances for SSV Jahn Regensburg in the 3. Fußball-Liga during his playing career.

References

External links 
 

1984 births
Living people
People from Kelheim
Sportspeople from Lower Bavaria
German footballers
Association football midfielders
3. Liga players
SSV Jahn Regensburg players
Footballers from Bavaria